The Circuito San Juan Villicum is a motor sports racing circuit located in the San Juan Province of Argentina close to National Route 40. There are seven turns to the right and ten left. The undulating contours were artificially created by moving more than 700,000 cubic meters of earth.

The track was designed by Leonardo Stella, a specialist architect in autodromes, and look for a degree of approval A1.

The inaugural racing event was on October 14, 2018 with the World Superbike Championship for motorcycles. The first automobile race was on November 18 of the same year with the Turismo Carretera and Súper TC 2000.

Events

 Current
 June: TC Pick Up
 October: Superbike World Championship, Supersport World Championship
 December: Turismo Carretera, TC Pista

 Former
 Formula Renault Argentina (2019, 2021)
 TC2000 (2019, 2021–2022)
 TCR South America Touring Car Championship (2022)
 Top Race V6 (2021–2022)
 Turismo Nacional (2020–2021)

Lap records 

The fastest official race lap records at the Circuito San Juan Villicum are listed as:

References

External links

Circuito San Juan Villicum
Circuito San Juan Villicum
Circuito San Juan Villicum
Circuito San Juan Villicum
Circuito San Juan Villicum